The Sound of The Shadows is the fourth rock album by British instrumental (and sometimes vocal) group The Shadows, released in July 1965 through EMI Records. The album was re-released by Capitol Records of Canada in stereo (as opposed to the original mono) on 4 October 1965.

The photograph for the alternative cover was taken outside EMI House in London in 1964, by staff photographer Tony Leigh. It was originally used as the inside cover of the Cliff Richard album Aladdin and His Wonderful Lamp.

Track listing

Personnel 
Hank Marvin - Lead guitar and vocals
Bruce Welch - Rhythm guitar and vocals
John Rostill - Bass guitar and vocals
Brian Bennett - Drums and percussion
Norrie Paramor - Producer and orchestral accompaniment on "Blue Sky, Blue Sea, Blue Me" and "The Windjammer"

Charts

References 

1965 albums
The Shadows albums
EMI Records albums